Marguerite J Trussler  is the Ethics Commissioner of the Canadian Province of Alberta,  an Officer of the Provincial Legislature.

Education
Trussler received her B.A. in 1969, her LL.B. in 1970 from the University of Alberta in Edmonton. She received her LL.M. in 1974 from the University of Melbourne, and her LL.D. in 2012 from the University of Alberta.

Career
Trussler served a Court of Queen's Bench of Alberta judge from 1986 to 2007. Arguably, the highest profile case she heard in her years on this Bench was the Charles Ng extradition hearing, when American journalists filled her court to follow the proceedings.

She also served as chair of the Alberta Gaming and Liquor Commission from 2007 to 2014.

Office of the Ethics Commissioner

Trussler was endorsed by the Members of the Legislative Assembly (MLAs) in May 2014, during the early months of the tenure of then Alberta Premier Dave Hancock, who served as interim leader of the Progressive Conservative Association. The Ethics Commissioner is an "independent officer of the legislature responsible for investigating complaints made against MLAs under the Conflict of Interest Act, providing advice to members on ethics issues and reviewing MLA disclosure statements." Then Lieutenant Governor in Council,  Donald Stewart Ethell  appointed Trussler following the recommendation of the MLAs. Trussler succeeded  Neil Wilkinson, a former Progressive Conservative party member. Before serving as Commissioner, Wilkinson served as the chair of Edmonton’s now-defunct Capital Health Region. His investigations into Peter Sandhu, a former MLA, and former premier Alison Redford, were heavily criticized by all three opposition parties.

Family 
Trussler is the wife of Sir Francis Price, 7th Baronet, .

References

Canadian King's Counsel
Lawyers in Alberta
Judges in Alberta
University of Alberta alumni
Living people
Wives of baronets
1946 births